Eresinopsides is a genus of butterflies in the family Lycaenidae. This genus is endemic to the Afrotropical realm.

Species
Eresinopsides bamptoni Henning & Henning, 2004
Eresinopsides bichroma Strand, 1911

References

Poritiinae
Lycaenidae genera